Head Coach is a 1987 video game published by MicroSearch.

Gameplay
Head Coach is a game in which fictional football teams and players are represented in a statistics-oriented strategy game.

Reception
Wyatt Lee reviewed the game for Computer Gaming World, and stated that "Minus yardage for this program must focus on the keyboard interface which, while opening up creative possibilities on the one hand, slows down the game on the other. Minus yardage must also be applied for the lack of easily accessible files on real NFL teams."

References

1987 video games
American football video games
Commodore 64 games
Sports management video games
Video games developed in the United Kingdom
Video games set in the United States
ZX Spectrum games